Gypsum Recycling International A/S (GRI) is a recycling company based in Nærum, Rudersdal Municipality, Denmark. GRI offers a system for the recycling of gypsum and plasterboard/drywall waste.

The company started its operations in Denmark in 2001. It originated from the largest demolition company in Scandinavia and based on these experiences developed a unique gypsum recycling system.  Within a few years, GRI increased the recycling rate for gypsum waste in Denmark up to a world record of 80%.5

Recycling system
The gypsum recycling system from GRI is a complete system with all the necessary elements for taking the waste from the place of generation to the processing facility, where the waste is transformed into a reusable raw material that is delivered to the plasterboard plant nearby at a cost lower than virgin gypsum. The system encompasses: a collection system/containers, a logistics system, mobile recycling units and end-users that can use  the recycled gypsum. The recycling unit is designed to be mobile and very compact. Hereby, multiple small processing plants/facilities located close to where the waste is generated and the recycled gypsum used can be serviced using the same recycling unit.

Markets
Nowadays, Gypsum Recycling operates in Denmark, Sweden, Norway, The Netherlands, Belgium and Germany and, furthermore, its technology is used in the US and Japan.

EU projects

GtoG
As the leading gypsum recycling company, GRI is currently, participating in the EU funded so called GtoG project  (Gypusm to Gypsum). The GtoG project is co-financed by the Life+ programme of the European Commission. It started in January 2013 and will finish in December 2015. The consortium is co-ordinated by Eurogypsum, the European Plaster and plasterboard manufacturers association and consists of 17 partners (2 universities- 5 demolition companies-1 consultant in deconstruction- 5 gypsum manufcaturers-1 laboratory- 2 recyclers). The overall aim of this project is to transform the gypsum demolition waste market to achieve higher recycling rates of gypsum waste, thereby helping to achieve a resource efficient economy.

Awards and certificates
Gypsum Recycling International and its sister companies have won several awards within Cleantech, Recycling, and Environmental Technology, honoring the company’s efforts for a greener future and reducing the global CO2 emissions with its recycling efforts.

Awards include: Cleantech Prisen 2007, Swedish Recycling Award 2010, Climate Cup 08, and Environmental Gazelle of 2007.

References

Recycling organizations
Service companies of Denmark
Service companies based in Copenhagen
Companies based in Rudersdal Municipality
Danish companies established in 2001